Francis Thomas Baring, 6th Baron Northbrook  (born 21 February 1954), is a British peer and Conservative politician.

The son of Francis Baring, 5th Baron Northbrook, and Rowena Margaret Manning, Northbrook was educated at Winchester College, and took a BA in history at the University of Bristol. In 1976 he joined Dixon Wilson & Co as a trainee chartered accountant. In 1981 he became a credit analyst at Baring Brothers & Co. In 1983, he moved into Baring Investment Management as an investment analyst. In 1985 he moved to Baring's Private Client Department. He became a Senior Investment Manager at Taylor Young Investment in 1990, and at Smith and Williamson Securities in 1993. He co-founded Mars Asset Management in 1996.

Lord Northbrook took his seat in the House of Lords on the death of his father in 1990. He is now one of the 92 hereditary peers who remain in the House of Lords after the House of Lords Act of 1999. He has since resisted further reform of the Lords, tabling amendments to a draft bill to abolish by-elections for hereditary peers, proposed by Lord Grocott in 2018. Lord Northbrook sits on the Conservative benches and was an Opposition Whip in the House of Lords from 1999 to 2000. He speaks on treasury, constitutional, and agricultural matters.

In 1987, Lord Northbrook married Amelia Sarah Elizabeth Taylor. They have three daughters, but were divorced in 2006. In 2013, Lord Northbrook married Charlotte Pike, the publisher and editor of the Almanach de Gotha.

There is no heir to the Barony of Northbrook. His heir as Baronet Baring of Larkbeer is his fourth cousin Peter Baring.

Lord Northbrook's home in Hampshire was destroyed by fire on 4 December 2005. One hundred firefighters were at the scene (with the swimming pool being used as a water store) in an attempt to salvage Lord Northbrook's personal belongings. Some art was saved and later sold to Hans-Adam II, Prince of Liechtenstein, as a consequence of the divorce.

He is a founding trustee of the Fortune Forum Charity which in its first year raised over £1 million for Global Poverty, Global Health, and Climate Change Charities.

He is a member of the advisory board of the Iman Foundation which aims to promote dialogue to strengthen international understanding and co-existence through the exchange of ideas, people, culture and religion.

His main hobbies are shooting, cricket, fishing, and skiing. He is a Fellow of the Royal Geographical Society: his clubs are Whites, Pratts, the Beefsteak, and the Worshipful Company of Gunmakers.

See also
Politics of the United Kingdom

References

1954 births
Living people
People educated at Winchester College
Alumni of the University of Bristol
Barons in the Peerage of the United Kingdom
Francis
Conservative Party (UK) hereditary peers
Fellows of the Royal Geographical Society
Eldest sons of British hereditary barons
Hereditary peers elected under the House of Lords Act 1999